Red Lick may refer to:

Places
United States
Red Lick, Mississippi, an unincorporated community
Red Lick, Texas, a city
Red Lick Independent School District, Texas